Trần Bình Trọng (1259–1285) was a Vietnamese general of the Trần Dynasty. Tran Binh Trong may also refer to:

 Roni Tran Binh Trong (b. 1987), a Finnish singer of Vietnamese ancestry
 , a Republic of Vietnam Navy frigate in commission from 1971 to 1975, named after the Trần Dynasty general